The Drama Desk Award for Outstanding Play is an annual award presented by Drama Desk in recognition of achievements in the theatre among Broadway, Off Broadway and Off-Off Broadway productions. The award was initially introduced in 1955 as the Vernon Rice Award for Outstanding Achievement in Theatre, before being removed from the ceremony between 1960 and 1974. The award later returned in the 1975 ceremony, with its current title.

Winners and nominees

1950s

1960s

1970s

1980s

1990s

2000s

2010s

2020s

See also
 Laurence Olivier Award for Best New Play
 Tony Award for Best Play

References

External links
 Drama Desk official website

Play